|}

The Queen's Vase is a Group 2 flat horse race in Great Britain open to three-year-old horses. It is run at Ascot over a distance of 1 mile 6 furlongs and 34 yards (2,847 metres), and it is scheduled to take place each year in June.

History
The event was established over a distance of 2 miles in 1838, and its original trophy was a gold vase donated by Queen Victoria. The race was initially confined to horses aged three, but it was opened to older horses in 1840. Its title was changed to the King's Vase in 1903, and it was given its current name in 1960.

The present system of race grading was introduced in 1971, and for a period the Queen's Vase held Group 3 status. It was relegated to Listed class in 1986, and it was restricted to three-year-olds in 1987. It returned to Group 3 level in 1991 and was downgraded to Listed status again in 2014. However in a move to recognise the importance of staying Flat races in the calendar the European Pattern Committee decided to upgrade the race to Group 2 status in 2017 while reducing its distance to 1 mile and 6 furlongs.

The Queen's Vase is now contested on the second day of the five-day Royal Ascot meeting. It is one of three perpetual trophies at the meeting, along with the Royal Hunt Cup and the Gold Cup, which can be kept permanently by the winning owners.

The 2013 running was renamed the 'Queen's Vase In Memory of Sir Henry Cecil' in memory of Sir Henry Cecil who died on 11 June 2013. Sir Henry had trained the winners of more races than anyone at the Royal meeting (75), including eight winners of the Queen's Vase.

Records
Leading jockey (6 wins):
 George Fordham – Arsenal (1857), Sedbury (1858), Horror (1860), Marie Stuart (1875), Ambassadress (1881), Tristan (1882)

Leading trainer (8 wins):
 Henry Cecil – Falkland (1972), General Ironside (1976), Le Moss (1978), Arden (1987), River God (1990), Jendali (1991), Stelvio (1995), Endorsement (1999)

Winners since 1978

Earlier winners

 1838: Mecca
 1839: Mendizabal
 1840: St Francis
 1841: Satirist
 1842: St Francis
 1843: Gorhambury
 1844: Alice Hawthorn
 1845: Sweetmeat
 1846: Grimston
 1847: The Hero
 1848: Gardenia
 1849: Glenalvon
 1850: Mildew
 1851: Cariboo
 1852: Leopold
 1853: Rataplan
 1854: The Hermit
 1855: Oulston
 1856: Fisherman
 1857: Arsenal
 1858: Sedbury
 1859: Schism
 1860: Horror
 1861: Parmesan
 1862: Tim Whiffler
 1863: Adventurer
 1864: Young Rapid
 1865: Eltham
 1866: Elland
 1867: Mail Train
 1868: Blinkhoolie
 1869: Thorwaldsen
 1870: Siderolite
 1871: Christopher Sly
 1872: Albert Victor
 1873: Thorn
 1874: Organist
 1875: Marie Stuart
 1876: Thunder
 1877: Skylark
 1878: Verneuil
 1879: Isonomy
 1880: Chippendale
 1881: Ambassadress
 1882: Tristan
 1883: Border Minstrel
 1884: St Gatien
 1885: Thebais
 1886: Bird of Freedom
 1887: Quilp
 1888: Exmoor
 1889: Morglay
 1890: Tyrant
 1891: Mons Meg
 1892: Martagon
 1893: Convent
 1894: Quaesitum
 1895: Florizel II
 1896: Pride
 1897: Count Schomberg
 1898: The Rush
 1899: no race
 1900: Solitaire
 1901: Mackintosh
 1902: Ice-maiden
 1903: Zinfandel
 1904: Bachelor's Button
 1905: Bachelor's Button
 1906: The White Knight
 1907: Golden Measure
 1908: Pillo
 1909: Amadis
 1910: Charles O'Malley
 1911: Martingale II
 1912: Tidal Wave
 1913: Shogun
 1914: Glorvina
 1915–18: no race
 1919: Silonyx
 1920: Kentish Cob
 1921: Copyright
 1922: Golden Myth
 1923: Puttenden
 1924: Audlem
 1925: Kentish Knock
 1926: High Art
 1927: Adieu
 1928: Maid of Perth
 1929: Covenden
 1930: Trimdon
 1931: Pomme d'Api
 1932: Silvermere
 1933: Gainslaw
 1934: Duplicate
 1935: Flash Bye
 1936: Rondo
 1937: Fearless Fox
 1938: Foxglove II
 1939: Atout Maitre
 1940–45: no race
 1946: Look Ahead
 1947: Auralia
 1948: Estoc
 1949: Lone Eagle
 1950: Fastlad
 1951: Faux Pas
 1952: Souepi
 1953: Absolve
 1954: Prescription
 1955: Prince Barle
 1956: French Beige
 1957: Tenterhooks
 1958: Even Money
 1959: Vivi Tarquin
 1960: Prolific
 1961: Black King
 1962: Pavot
 1963: Hereford
 1964: I Titan
 1965: Beddard
 1966: Bally Russe
 1967: The Accuser
 1968: Zorba II
 1969: Tantivy
 1970: Yellow River
 1971: Parnell
 1972: Falkland
 1973: Tara Brooch
 1974: Royal Aura
 1975: Blood Royal
 1976: General Ironside
 1977: Millionaire

See also
 Horse racing in Great Britain
 List of British flat horse races

References
 Paris-Turf:
 Racing Post:

 galopp-sieger.de – Queen's Vase.
 ifhaonline.org – International Federation of Horseracing Authorities – Queen's Vase (2019).
 pedigreequery.com – Queen's Vase – Royal Ascot.
 

Flat races in Great Britain
Ascot Racecourse
Flat horse races for three-year-olds
Recurring sporting events established in 1838